The 1989 German Grand Prix was a Formula One motor race held at the Hockenheimring on 30 July 1989. The race was won by Ayrton Senna, ahead of Alain Prost and Nigel Mansell.

Background 
Prior to the race meeting there had been a major shakeup of management at Team Lotus. Long time Lotus man and team boss since Colin Chapman's untimely death in 1982 Peter Warr had been asked to leave the team and was replaced as team manager by Rupert Manwaring, while Lotus also had a new chairman in Tony Rudd.

Qualifying

Pre-qualifying report
Pre-qualifying had been reorganised going into the second half of the season, with several drivers and teams either losing or gaining the right to progress without the need to pre-qualify. Brabham, Dallara and Rial had scored enough points across the opening rounds of the season to enable them to escape the Friday morning sessions entirely. Larrousse, with their Lamborghini V12-engined Lolas had scored no points thus far, so were required to pre-qualify for Grands Prix. Philippe Alliot was now partnered by Michele Alboreto who had left Tyrrell after a sponsorship dispute, replacing Éric Bernard, who had stood in at Larrousse for two races.

Also new to pre-qualifying was Roberto Moreno, joining his Coloni team-mate Pierre-Henri Raphanel; and Gabriele Tarquini, joining his AGS team-mate Yannick Dalmas in the Friday morning sessions. This was despite Tarquini's sixth-place finish at the Mexican Grand Prix, as Minardi had scored three points at Silverstone. Onyx had also only scored two points so were forced to continue to pre-qualify. Osella, EuroBrun and Zakspeed had scored no points thus far, so also had to continue to pre-qualify.

Bertrand Gachot topped the pre-qualifying session for the third time in a row, with his Onyx team-mate Stefan Johansson second. The two Larrousse-Lola drivers were third and fourth, with Alboreto edging out Dalmas in the AGS by a thousandth of a second. Nicola Larini was sixth in his Osella, with his team-mate Piercarlo Ghinzani again failing at this stage, down in eighth. Moreno and Raphanel were ninth and tenth, with Gregor Foitek eleventh in the new, untested EuroBrun ER189. The Zakspeeds were bottom of the time sheets, with Aguri Suzuki outpacing Bernd Schneider for only the second time this season.

Pre-qualifying classification

* Driver failed to pre-qualify.

Qualifying report
The McLaren-Honda's of Ayrton Senna and Alain Prost dominated qualifying on the ultra fast Hockenheim circuit, with Senna just under a second faster than Prost, who was himself almost eight-tenths faster than the Ferrari 640 of Nigel Mansell.

During the Friday session Senna ran over a stone which put a sizeable hole in his car's undertray and the resulting damage would require a complete change of car, the problem being that the team only had three of the new transverse gearbox cars in Germany. As a precaution, team manager Jo Ramírez instructed the team's secondary (test) crew, who were on their way to Imola for a week of testing with the new car, to stop in Dijon (eastern France) in case the race team needed a replacement chassis. When Senna's car was deemed too badly damaged, the test crew made their way to Hockenheim and McLaren were back to having three full cars ready for use by Saturday's morning practice.

Qualifying classification

* Driver failed to qualify.

Race

Race report
The race started with Senna on pole position and Prost alongside him. At the start, Gerhard Berger in the semi-automatic Ferrari made a strong start from fourth, passing both Senna, Prost and his teammate Mansell to lead tinto the first corner with Senna, Prost and Mansell following in succession. At the start Philippe Alliot went off the track at the start after he was touched from behind by the Minardi of Pierluigi Martini and lost control of his Lola, spinning off into the grass. He was able to rejoin but his race only lasted 20 laps before his Lamborghini developed an oil leak. His new teammate Michele Alboreto was forced out of his first race with Larrousse just past turn 1 on the second lap after his car's electrics failed. Alboreto had qualified 26th and last, only 0.016 ahead of the Minardi of Luis Pérez-Sala.

Berger's lead was to last about a quarter of a lap as a result of the greater power of the Honda V10 engines. Senna had Berger before the first chicane, and Prost outbraked him at the Ostkurve. At the start of the second lap, it was Senna leading from Prost, Berger, Mansell, Thierry Boutsen (Williams-Renault), Alessandro Nannini (Benetton-Ford), Emanuele Pirro (Benetton-Ford), Riccardo Patrese (Williams-Renault), and Nelson Piquet (Lotus-Judd).

The McLarens of Senna and Prost and the Ferraris of Mansell and Berger started to pull away from the field, with the Benettons of Pirro and Nannini, and the Williams of Patrese just barely clinging on (Boutsen retired on lap 5 after being punted off by Pirro at the Bremsschikane 2). On lap 14, Mansell had been hounding Berger for 2 laps, Berger had a puncture right when approaching the first chicane, and he went up on the marker, launching his Ferrari in midair, landing on a grassy patch and went across the track, just barely avoiding Mansell and came to rest on the trackside grass.

Prost and Senna were on the limit the entire race and Prost hounded Senna for 16 laps, until he went in for his pit stop for tyres, which was a slow one of 18 seconds, which put Mansell in second place and gave Senna a stronger lead. The next lap, Mansell came into the pits for his tyre change and his pit stop was faster than Prost's but still a poor stop of 11 seconds, which dropped him down back to fourth behind, Senna, Pirro and Prost. Senna decided to take advantage of his lead and came into the pits for his tyre change, his stop was even worse than Prost's, lasting 23 seconds. This dropped him down to second behind Prost and Pirro had come into the pits for a tyre change and dropped to fourth.

Pirro crashed into the styrofoam barriers at the stadium entrance on lap 26 and had to be taken to the hospital after one of the barriers had hit his helmet. With Mansell having problems with his Ferrari, Senna and Prost battled for the entire race, as both drivers were driving on the limit. They started trading off fastest laps and Prost held off Senna for almost the entire race. On lap 43, Prost's gearbox malfunctioned, lost sixth (top) gear and Senna passed him at turn 11. Prost limped around the track for the next 2 laps and Senna cruised around the track to grab his fourth victory of the season, followed by Prost second, Mansell third, Patrese fourth, Piquet fifth and Derek Warwick (Arrows-Ford) sixth.

In the post race press conference, Senna refused to speculate on whether he would have been able to pass Prost if he hadn't lost top gear, instead stating that winning after suffering four straight DNFs was all he was concerned about. For his part, Prost was of the firm belief that he would have had no trouble holding on for the win had he not had a gearbox problem.

Race classification

Championship standings after the race

Drivers' Championship standings

Constructors' Championship standings

 Note: Only the top five positions are included for both sets of standings.

References

German Grand Prix
German Grand Prix
German Grand Prix
German Grand Prix